Phil LaPorta (born May 4, 1952) is a former American football tackle. He played for the New Orleans Saints from 1974 to 1975.

References

1952 births
Living people
American football tackles
Penn State Nittany Lions football players
New Orleans Saints players